Renewable energy in Turkey is mostly hydroelectricity, geothermal energy and solar energy. Although sun and wind could supply plenty of energy in Turkey, hydropower is the only renewable energy which is fully exploited, averaging about a fifth of national electricity supply. However in drought years much less electricity is generated by hydro. Over half of capacity is renewables, and it is estimated that over half of generation could be from renewables by 2026, but Turkey has invested less in solar and wind power than similar Mediterranean countries. Turkey lacks a renewable energy plan beyond 2023 which includes transport, industry, heating and cooling as well as electricity generation. More renewable energy could be used to reduce the nation's greenhouse gas emissions, and thus avoid paying other countries' carbon tariffs. Turkey is a net exporter of wind power equipment, but a net importer of solar power equipment. Total non-hydro renewables overtook hydro in 2021. Solar is expected to overtake wind before 2030.

The Energy Minister said in 2023 that by 2035 renewables would supply almost a quarter of the nation’s energy. According to one study, by massively increasing solar power in the south and wind power in the west the country's entire energy demand could be met from renewable sources. Others say that nuclear power will keep the grid stable from fluctuations in variable renewable energy. And others that more geothermal baseload capacity should be added. Geothermal power in Turkey is used mainly for heating, and solar water heating is also widespread. According to a 2022 report from thinktank Ember, Turkey needs to expand renewables at least twice as fast, to decarbonize the electricity sector and lower import bills. A 2022 study by Shura says that renewables could generate 70% of electricity by 2030, with coal reduced to 5%. Shura simultation of typical spring 2030 generation shows that wind and nuclear could provide baseload, and solar much of daytime demand, reserving dammed hydro for evening flexibility. Many new 400kV transmission lines are planned to be built by 2030.

Some academics say that governments have not allowed civil society enough say on energy policy, leading to protests against building hydropower plants, geothermal power, and at least one wind farm. Large companies include the state electricity generation company(mainly hydro), Aydem, and Kalyon.

Solar power

Wind power

Hydroelectricity

Geothermal energy

Bioenergy

Hybrid projects, storage and integration 
A different power source can be added up to 15% capacity under the same licence provided max generation is not exceeded (but does not receive USD subsidy). Solar power is sometimes added to existing power plants, such as geothermal and wind.

There is a virtual power plant which includes geothermal, wind, solar and hydro. Increasing Turkey's proportion of electric cars in use to 10% by 2030 would help integrate variable electricity.

Economics
The World Bank has suggested a plan. There are benefits in employment, industrial production, and balance of trade. In 2021 renewables expanded faster than the EU average but slower than the world average.

 feed-in-tariffs in lira per kWh are: wind and solar 0.32, hydro 0.4, geothermal 0.54, and various rates for different types of biomass: for all these there is also a bonus of 0.08 per kWh if at least 55% local components are used. Tariffs will apply for 10 years and the local bonus for 5 years. There is 30% foreign currency linkage and power can be sold on the market. Although feed-in tariffs continue to 2030 investors are concerned about the volatility of the lira.

If more renewable energy is generated it may be possible to export green hydrogen to the EU. Eser Ozdil at the Atlantic Council said in 2022 that interconnectors with the EU need to be greatly increased, and suggested joint electricity projects with Balkan companies.

In 2022 and 2023 money was transferred from some renewables plants with low operating costs to some power plants with high operating costs, such as imported coal and gas. In late 2022, despite some renewables generators calling for it to be scrapped, this “Support Fee based on Source” or “Maximum Settlement Price Mechanism” was extended for 6 months with the excess used to subsidize all regulated consumers. This applies to both the market exchange price and fixed prices determined by bilateral agreements.

Increasing export of electricity to the EU has been suggested but analyst Kadri Tastan says that depends on "reliable and solid political relations between the two and an ambitious environmental policy in Turkey". Using renewable electricity to produce green hydrogen for export has also been suggested, but would require substantial investment. However Tastan expects the economy to be the political priority up to the 2023 election, not decarbonization.

The fuel-only cost of fossil gas-fired power in early 2022 was 128 USD/MWh, which was more than double that of the levelized cost of electricity  of new utility scale solar PV and new onshore wind. Renewable energy is competitive with domestic coal. However in 2022 wind and solar remained more expensive than energy efficiency measures, which were estimated at 14 USD/MWh.

A 2022 study by Ember in advance of the Energy Ministry long-term plan (which they said would be before COP27) suggested that dependence on imported energy could be reduced from a half to a quarter by 2030 by energy efficiency and increasing solar capacity to 40 GW and wind to 30 GW: this would mean the increase in wind and solar accelerating from 1 GW a year each to 2.5 and 4 GW respectively. They said that domestic solar manufacturing capacity could achieve 8 GW a year.The report was based on 4 modeling studies by: ● The Istanbul Policy Center's (IPC) ● The World Bank’s (WB) Climate and Development report ● A report from Europe Beyond Coal (EBC) and other local environmental organizations ● Analysis from Turkish energy transition think tank SHURA.

A green tariff has been offered since 2021.

Regulations 
Unlicensed (about 2% of supply and over 90% of which is solar) generators must apply to distribution companies or industrial park license holders in their region for technical checks and if technically OK approval. Production could increase far more quickly if subsidies for coal were abolished and the auction system was improved. In August 2022 the Unlicensed Electricity Generation Regulation was amended so that the amount of surplus energy that can be sold may not exceed the total consumption of the consumer the previous year: the excess goes to the Renewable Energy Resources Support Mechanism. A 2022 regulation was claimed to be unconstitutional by being retrospective.

Politics 
Some academics say that governments have not allowed civil society enough say on energy policy, leading to protests against building hydropower, geothermal power, and at least one wind farm. in 2022 the EU complained about local content requirements, saying that they did not meet WTO and EU-Türkiye Customs Union rules.

Health benefits 

Possible health benefits of expanding renewable energy more quickly have been estimated at US$800 million a year.

History 

Geothermal heat and solar heat were developed early. Hydropower was expanded for many decades with geothermal, wind and solar electricity following.

See also 

 List of renewable energy topics by country
 Energy conservation#Turkey

Notes

References

Sources

External links
 SHURA Energy Transition Center
 Çevreci Enerji Derneği (Environmental energy society - in Turkish)